Strange Angels is Kristin Hersh's second studio album, produced by Kristin Hersh and co-produced by Joe Henry (except for "Like You" which was co-produced by Steve Rizzo). The album peaked at #64 on the Official UK Albums Chart. It also peaked at #40 on the US's Billboard Heatseekers Album Chart. The album carried the dedication: "for Billy, Dylan, Ryder, Wyatt and TM (1984-1997)".

Track listing

Personnel
Ivo Watts-Russell - executive producer
Shinro Ohtake - artwork
Vaughan Oliver - design
John Patrick Salisbury - photography

References

External links
Strange Angels album page at 4AD
Lyrics at alwaysontherun

1998 albums
Kristin Hersh albums
Albums produced by Joe Henry
4AD albums